Flanagan  may refer to:
 Flanagan (surname), a common Irish surname, people with that surname
 Flanagan (model), early page 3 girl
 Flanagan, Illinois
 Flanagan Island, an island in the United States Virgin Islands
 Flanagan (1985 film)
 Flanagan, a band fronted by Mark Flanagan (musician)

See also
 Edith M. Flanigen